Himerius (variants include Himerios, Imerius, Imerio, Imier, Immer) can refer to:

Himerius, Bithynian philosopher
Himerius of Tarragona, an archbishop of Tarragona (Spain) in ca. 385.
Himerius of Nicomedia, bishop of Nicomedia
Himerios (admiral), a Byzantine admiral and statesman, fl. 900-920
A fictional character in the series Monarchies of God

Christian saints
Himerius of Immertal
Himerius of Cremona
Himerius of Bosto
Another name for Saint Camelianus, bishop of Troyes